Anicius is a monotypic genus of Mexican jumping spiders containing the single species, Anicius dolius. It was first described by Ralph Vary Chamberlin in 1925, and is only found in Mexico.

References

Monotypic Salticidae genera
Salticidae
Spiders of Mexico
Taxa named by Ralph Vary Chamberlin